Mikheil Kobakhidze (5 April 1939 – 13 October 2019) was a Georgian screenwriter, film director, actor and composer. He was born in Tbilisi. A Retrospective of his work was held at the 1996 Venice Film Festival.

Career 
Mikheil Kobakhidze graduated from VGIK in 1965, As a student, he created the short films "Young Love" and "Carousel". His 1964 graduation film "Wedding" won three prizes at the Oberhausen International Short Film Festival, including the festival's main prize. However, his original graduation film, "Eight and a Half", was considered anti-Soviet and destroyed by censors.

In 1967 Kobakhidze made the film "Umbrella", which won the main prize in 1967 at the Kraków Film Festival. Themes in Kobakhidze's work such as nonconformism, rebellion, disobedience, and individualism ran against Soviet ideology, causing the filmmaker to run into censorship problems. Kobakhidze spent some time living and working in France. A retrospective of the director's films was organized at the Venice Film Festival in 1996.

Personal life 
Mikheil Kobakhidze was married to actress and politician Natela Machavariani. Their son was actor Gega Kobakhidze, who, along with his wife Tina Petviashvili and five other Georgians, attempted to hijack a plane to escape from the Soviet Union in 1983.

Filmography

References

External links
 

1939 births
2019 deaths
Film people from Tbilisi
Screenwriters from Georgia (country)
20th-century male actors from Georgia (country)
Composers from Georgia (country)
Actors from Tbilisi
Male film actors from Georgia (country)